The Yereance–Kettel House is located in Rutherford, New Jersey. The homestead was nominated for the National Register of Historic Places and determined eligible on January 10, 1983, but was not listed due to owner objection.

History
The home was built by Hesel Yereance between the years of 1809 and 1820. The home was purchased by George E. Woodward in 1866. Woodward remodeled the home in 1870 and sold it to the Kettel family in 1876. The Kettel family sold the home to Fairleigh Dickinson University in 1955, which maintained a Rutherford campus until 1997. Another house from East Rutherford known as the Ackerman–Outwater House was moved to the property and attached to the Yereance–Kettel House by 1957.

References

External links
 Google Street View of Yereance-Kettel house

Houses completed in 1820
Houses in Bergen County, New Jersey
New Jersey Register of Historic Places
Rutherford, New Jersey